Jaroslava Obermaierová (born 10 April 1946 in Prague) is a Czech actress. She starred in the 1969/1970 film Witchhammer under director Otakar Vávra, as well as the TV-series Ulice.

References

1946 births
Living people
Actresses from Prague
Czech film actresses
Czech television actresses
20th-century Czech actresses
21st-century Czech actresses
Czech stage actresses
Czech voice actresses
Academy of Performing Arts in Prague alumni